Chuck Berry in Memphis is the eleventh studio album by Chuck Berry, released in 1967 by Mercury Records.

Track listing
All songs written by Chuck Berry except as noted
 "Back to Memphis" – 2:40
 "I Do Really Love You" – 2:28
 "Ramblin' Rose" (Joe Sherman, Noel Sherman) – 2:34
 "Sweet Little Rock and Roller" (re-recording) – 2:14
 "My Heart Will Always Belong to You" – 2:40
 "Oh Baby Doll" (re-recording) – 2:15
 "Check Me Out" – 2:32
 "It Hurts Me Too" (Mel London) – 2:57
 "Bring Another Drink" (Bob Bell, Roy Branker) – 2:34
 "So Long" (Irving Melsher, Remus Harris, Russ Morgan) – 2:43
 "Goodnight, Well It's Time to Go" (Calvin Carter, James Hudson) - 2:20
 "Flying Home" (Some reissues of the album include this song as the final track) - 2:25

Personnel
 Chuck Berry –  guitar, vocals
 Satch Arnold – drums
 Tommy Cogbill –  bass guitar
 Bobby Emmons –  piano
 Andrew Love – tenor saxophone
 Gene Miller –  trumpet
 James Mitchell –  baritone saxophone
 Reggie Young – guitar

References

External links

Chuck Berry albums
1967 albums
Mercury Records albums